Bashirul Haq (24 June 1942 – 4 April 2020) was a Bangladeshi architect, town planner and educator. He is regarded as one of the most influential architects in South Asia.

Early life
Haq was born in Brahmanbaria (now a district of Bangladesh). His father was a Deputy Collector from the Sylhet district and for that reason, Haq spent the majority of his childhood there. He completed his Bachelor of Architecture from the National College of Arts, in Lahore, Pakistan in 1964. He received John Heinrich Tuition, Scholarship and Teaching Assistantship at University of New Mexico, United States in 1971 and completed his masters in architecture from the university in 1975.

Career

After completing his master's degree, Haq started working for the firm Kallmann McKinnell. He was interested in returning to his homeland. However, another Bangladeshi-American engineer FR Khan discouraged him from returning to Bangladesh citing a newly independent war devastated nation. Khan, who was then the partner of SOM instead interviewed and advised Haq to join there. Khan suggested he visit Europe and return to the USA. But Haq flew to Bangladesh from Europe and started practicing architecture. He established Bashirul Haq & Associates in 1977. After several years of not visiting the United States, in 1989, he visited Massachusetts Institute of Technology as an invited design critic.

In his 46.2 years of professional career, Haq has designed more than 300 buildings. According to Haq, the works of Alvar Aalto and Aldo Rossi inspired him most.

Selected works

Residential
 Architect's Family Home and Studio, Indira Road, Dhaka
 Bhatshala House (Architect's village home), Brahmanbaria
 Ramna Apartment Complex, Moghbazar, Dhaka
 Century Apartment Complex, Moghbazar, Dhaka
 Century Tower, Moghbazar, Dhaka
 Lake View Apartment Complex, Dhanmondi, Dhaka
 Segunbagicha Apartment Complex, Segunbagicha, Dhaka
 Kalindi Apartment Complex, 36 Indira Road, Dhaka
 Gulshan Pride, Gulshan, Dhaka
 Dhanshiri Apartment Complex, 35 Indira Road, Dhaka
 Asra Apartments, Dhanmondi, Dhaka

Office
 20-storied Association for Social Advancement (ASA) Head Office Building
 20-storied Head Office Building of Bangladesh Chemical Industries Corporation (BCIC), Dilkusha C/A., Dhaka
 20-storied Head Office Building of People's Insurance Company Ltd. (PICL), Dilkusha C/A., Dhaka
 Projects under Cyclone Related Disaster Preparedness Programme
 Community Development Centre at Kutubdia, Moghnama and Moheshkhali and Cox's Bazar
 German Red Cross Community Based Multipurpose Cyclone Shelters at Tolatoli, Kachubunia and Khandkar Para, Teknaf, Cox's Bazar
 Cyclone resistant Housing in 6 Locations at Cox's Bazar district
 MIDAS Center, Dhanmondi, Dhaka

Physical planning
 Physical Planning of 3 Nos. Upazilas namely Katiadi, Kuliarchar & Bajitpur under Kishoreganj District
 Physical Planning of 3 Nos. Upazilas namely Nagarkanda, Alphadanga and Charvadrashan under Faridpur District
 Physical Planning of Faridpur District

Institutes
 Facilities for American International and Secondary School, Baridhara, Dhaka
 Hostel cum-Seminar Facilities Hosted People's Health Assembly
 Shabuj Shona Center, Manikgonj
 Training Center for Nijerakori, Bogra
 Chhayanaut Bhaban, Dhanmondi, Dhaka
 Sunbeams School, Uttara, Dhaka
 East West University, Dhaka
 Drik-Pathshala, Panthapath, Dhaka

Consultancy
 Central Diesel Workshop and Housing Project for Bangladesh Railway
 US Chancery Building, Dhaka. Kallmann McKinnell & Wood, USA
 Rail II Project for Bangladesh Railway. Dhaka, Parbatipur, Pahartali, Ishurdi. International Rail Consultant, Canada.
 GMP Standard Factory Design at Tongi for Beximco Pharmaceutical Ltd. Tongi. CMPS&F Pty Ltd., Australia.

Awards and honors
 Aga Khan Award for Architecture, shortlisted in 1980, 1992 and 2001
 Member, Board of Trustees, Fazlur Rahman Khan Foundation, Dhaka
 Became part of an International Exhibit Entitled 5000 years of Pakistan
 Chairman of the jury board, Holcim Green Built Bangladesh Award

Publications
 1994 “Battling the Storm – Study on Cyclone Resistance Housing“. Published by the German Red Cross, 1999.

See also
 Muzharul Islam
 B.V. Doshi
 Charles Correa
 Raj Rewal

References

2020 deaths
1942 births
Bangladeshi architects
Fellows of the American Institute of Architects
Modernist architects
20th-century American architects
21st-century Bangladeshi architects
National College of Arts alumni
University of New Mexico alumni
Massachusetts Institute of Technology faculty